The Boulder Bank (Māori: Te Taero a Keropa or Te Tāhuna o Tama-i-ea) is a very unusual naturally formed landform in Nelson, New Zealand. It is a 13 kilometre long stretch of rocky substrate which begins at the Mackay Bluff and ends at the Cut of the Nelson Harbour. Haulashore Island was once a part of the Boulder Bank, but the Cut made it an island, and it is no longer connected to the Boulder Bank. The Boulder Bank separates Tasman Bay and the Nelson Haven and is managed as a scenic reserve by the Department of Conservation.

Geology and geography
The Boulder Bank is composed of granodiorite. The source of this rock is Mackay Bluff. It is still debated what process or processes have resulted in this odd structure. Longshore drift, however, is the most accepted hypothesis for creation. The main objection for longshore drift is that Tasman Bay does not receive enough wave action to move the large boulders in a south west direction. Studies have been conducted since 1892 to determine speed of boulder movement. Rates of the top course gravel movement have been estimated at 7.5 metres a year.

The Cut
The Cut was made to enable the Nelson port to allow the increasing demands of sea transport for the Tasman area. Construction started in 1903 and in 1905 a 61-metre wide entrance was operational. Today the Cut is 150 metres wide and dredged every six months to maintain a depth of 10 metres.

Lighthouse

The Boulder Bank Lighthouse was erected in 1862. It is located near the port end of the Boulder Bank and was New Zealand's second permanent lighthouse. It is registered with the Historic Places Trust as a category I structure with registration number 41.

Notes

References
 Hartstein, ND and Warren Dickinson, W (2005) Wave energy and clast transport in eastern Tasman Bay, New Zealand Earth Surface Processes and Landforms, 31:6 (703–714).
 Warren, Karen. Rolling Stones: Nelson's Boulder Bank, Its Place in Our History and Hearts, 320 pp, 2009, Nikau Press, Nelson, New Zealand.

External links
 The story of the Boulder Bank
 The Nelson Boulder Bank

Spits of New Zealand
Geography of Nelson, New Zealand
Barrier islands
Landforms of the Nelson Region
Rock formations of New Zealand